Steven Schkolne (born 1976 in Cape Town, South Africa), inventor of speedcabling, is a South African American computer scientist, inventor, and digital artist.

Biography
Schkolne was born in Cape Town and moved to the United States as a child. During high school he attended North Carolina School of Science and Mathematics. Later he earned his BS from Carnegie Mellon University. Schkolne went on to obtain his PhD in Computer Science at Caltech where he pioneered foundational methods for drawing in 3D or virtual reality environments.

Surface drawing
Schkolne's graduate work at Caltech resulted in the first fully functional drawing program for virtual reality. The program, an early precursor to Google's Tilt Brush, was shown at SIGGRAPH in 1999. The program captured hand movements and translated them into digital strokes. Schkolne worked in collaboration with BMW's Designworks to use Surface Drawing as a platform for creating conceptual prototypes.

References

1976 births
Living people
People from Cape Town
South African emigrants to the United States
California Institute of Technology alumni
Carnegie Mellon University alumni
American computer scientists
Computer graphics researchers
Digital artists